Charles Christopher Hall (born April 25, 1970) is a former American football safety in the National Football League (NFL) for the Dallas Cowboys. He was drafted by the Cowboys in the ninth round of the 1992 NFL Draft. He played college football at East Carolina University. Hall was also a member of the Frankfurt Galaxy of the World League of American Football (WLAF).

Early years
Hall attended Pemberton Township High School, where he practiced football, basketball and track. As a senior, he was a second-team All-state running back and an All-conference selection at small forward.

He accepted a football scholarship from East Carolina University. Although he was recruited as a running back, he became a defensive starter in the middle of his first year and was recognized as one of the country's top freshman cornerbacks by the Sporting News, while registering 3 interceptions.

As a junior, he registered 85 tackles (second on the team), 2 interceptions and 8 passes defensed (led the team). He had a career-high 20 tackles against regional rival the University of South Carolina.

As a senior he had 3 interceptions, while helping his team to its best record (11-1) and highest ranking (9th by the A.P.) in school history. He posted a season-high 12 tackles against the University of Illinois, 11 tackles against the University of Pittsburgh and 10 against the University of South Carolina.

He finished his college career with 9 interceptions, 26 passes defensed (school record) and 4 fumble recoveries.

Professional career
Hall was selected by the Dallas Cowboys in the 9th round (250th overall) of the 1992 NFL Draft, with the intention of converting him into a safety. He was one of 7 defensive backs drafted that year by the Cowboys and was waived on August 24.

He was re-signed on April 20, 1993, before being waived on October 13.

Hall later played for the WLAF's Frankfurt Galaxy, leading or tying for the league lead in interceptions in three years: 8 in 1995, 4 in 1996 and 4 in 1997.

References

External links
Just Sports Stats

Living people
1970 births
African-American players of American football
American football defensive backs
East Carolina Pirates football players
Dallas Cowboys players
Frankfurt Galaxy players
People from Pemberton Township, New Jersey
Players of American football from New Jersey
Sportspeople from Burlington County, New Jersey
21st-century African-American sportspeople
20th-century African-American sportspeople